The 1928 St. Louis Browns season involved the Browns finishing 3rd in the American League with a record of 82 wins and 72 losses.

Offseason 
 December 2, 1927: Harry Rice, Chick Galloway and Elam Vangilder were traded by the Browns to the Detroit Tigers for Heinie Manush and Lu Blue.

Regular season

Season standings

Record vs. opponents

Notable transactions 
 April 25, 1928: Wally Gerber was traded by the Browns to the Boston Red Sox for Hal Wiltse.

Roster

Player stats

Batting

Starters by position 
Note: Pos = Position; G = Games played; AB = At bats; H = Hits; Avg. = Batting average; HR = Home runs; RBI = Runs batted in

Other batters 
Note: G = Games played; AB = At bats; H = Hits; Avg. = Batting average; HR = Home runs; RBI = Runs batted in

Pitching

Starting pitchers 
Note: G = Games pitched; IP = Innings pitched; W = Wins; L = Losses; ERA = Earned run average; SO = Strikeouts

Other pitchers 
Note: G = Games pitched; IP = Innings pitched; W = Wins; L = Losses; ERA = Earned run average; SO = Strikeouts

Relief pitchers 
Note: G = Games pitched; W = Wins; L = Losses; SV = Saves; ERA = Earned run average; SO = Strikeouts

Notes

References 
1928 St. Louis Browns team page at Baseball Reference
1928 St. Louis Browns season at baseball-almanac.com

St. Louis Browns seasons
Saint Louis Browns season
St Louis